Faisal Mubashir (born 29 September 1986) is a Pakistani cricketer who plays for the Germany cricket team. He played 25 first-class, 10 List A and 16 Twenty20 matches in Pakistan between 2011/12 and 2016/17. In October 2021, he was added to Germany's Twenty20 International (T20I) squad for the Regional Final of the 2021 ICC Men's T20 World Cup Europe Qualifier tournament in Spain. He made his T20I debut on 15 October 2021, for Germany against Jersey.

In January 2022, he was named in Germany's team for the 2022 ICC Men's T20 World Cup Global Qualifier A tournament in Oman.

References

External links
 

1986 births
Living people
Pakistani cricketers
German cricketers
Germany Twenty20 International cricketers
Faisalabad cricketers
Bahawalpur cricketers
Baluchistan cricketers
Rawalpindi cricketers
National Bank of Pakistan cricketers
Cricketers from Karachi
Pakistani expatriates in Germany